Botogol is a rural locality (a settlement) in Okinsky District, Republic of Buryatia, Russia. The population was 10 as of 2010. There are 4 streets.

Geography 
Botogol is located 45 km southeast of Orlik (the district's administrative centre) by road. Sorok is the nearest rural locality.

References 

Rural localities in Okinsky District